Lee Patrick Mastelotto (born September 10, 1955) is an American rock drummer and record producer. He has been a member of King Crimson, Stick Men, Mr. Mister and O.R.k., as well as working as a session drummer with XTC, The Pointer Sisters and The Rembrandts, among others. In addition, he has led or co-led other projects including Mastica, Tuner, TU and The Mastelottos.

For King Crimson, he initially formed part of the "Double Trio" lineup from 1994 to 1997, working with Bill Bruford as part of a double-drumkit arrangement. Following Bruford's departure in 1997, Mastelotto remained with King Crimson, becoming their longest-serving drummer and working both solo and in various configurations with subsequent drummers Gavin Harrison, Bill Rieflin and Jeremy Stacey. 

Mastelotto is a pioneer and continuing developer of a mixed acoustic-and-electronic drumming approach which he refers to as "traps and buttons", and which incorporates techniques and methods from rock, pop and electronic dance music styles. As well as being a drummer, he works as a producer, engineer and mixer, working extensively with digital audio workstations.

Career

Early years and Mr. Mister

Mastelotto was born in Chico, California. He started playing the drums at the age of 10; by the time he was 16 he was playing in popular local bands and while still in high school commuted several hours to Lake Tahoe for gigs. Moving to Los Angeles in the mid-1970s, Mastelotto worked for many bands and as a studio session drummer. In this capacity he worked for Martin Briley, Holly Knight, Scandal, Al Jarreau, The Pointer Sisters, Patti LaBelle, Kenny Loggins, Martika, Danny Wilde and Holly Penfield as well as playing drums on the double platinum album Rockland by Canadian rock musician Kim Mitchell.

In 1983, Mastelotto was a founding member of Mr. Mister. The band had a number one album, Welcome to the Real World, and two number one singles, "Broken Wings" and "Kyrie". They recorded four albums, with the fourth, Pull, recorded in 1989–1990 but remaining unreleased until late 2010.

His tenure with Mr. Mister was followed by more session work for bands such as XTC, The Sugarcubes, Hall & Oates, Cock Robin, The Rembrandts, Jude Cole, Eddie Money, Tina Arena, Matthew Sweet, Julia Fordham, Robyn Hitchcock and David Sylvian. In 1991 Mastelotto co-produced Peter Kingsbery's first solo album before being asked to join King Crimson.

King Crimson

Mastelotto has been a member of King Crimson since 1994, resulting in him becoming their longest serving drummer. He was the first of two drummers hired for the "Double Trio" line-up of the mid-1990s, the second being previous long-term King Crimson drummer Bill Bruford. Mastelotto and Bruford operated as parallel drummers for the Double Trio, playing different styles and parts which sometimes intermeshed and sometimes worked separately. Following Bruford's departure in 1997, Mastelotto became the band's sole drummer, working mostly on the electronic Roland V-Drums set and bringing in simultaneous/triggered electronic drum loops and textures based on his interest in intelligent dance music and drum and bass. For King Crimson's 2008 lineup, the band returned to a double-drummer arrangement with Mastelotto now joined by Gavin Harrison. 

For the period of King Crimson activity lasting from 2013 to 2021 (the "Seven Headed Beast" and "Three over Five" line-ups), Mastelotto played as part of a three-drummer arrangement, initially with Harrison and Bill Rieflin, and subsequently with Harrison and Jeremy Stacey. In each of these setups, Mastelotto also took on an extended percussionist role incorporating multiple sound effects, samples and programs (taking on something of the function played by percussionist/"allsorts" contributor Jamie Muir in the 1972 King Crimson).

To date, Mastelotto has appeared on three King Crimson studio albums (Thrak, The ConstruKction of Light and The Power to Believe, released between 1995 and 2003), one mini-album, two EPs and numerous live releases between 1995 and 2022.

King Crimson-related

During, and in parallel to, his King Crimson work, Mastelotto has been an integral part of several King Crimson-related bands. He produced, edited, mixed and played on the ProjeKct 3 and ProjeKct 4 releases by the band's "ProjeKcts" subgroupings, playing a particularly dominant role on the IDM-influenced ProjeKct 3. 

Mastelotto currently works with King Crimson bass/Chapman Stick player Tony Levin and centrozoon's touch guitarist Markus Reuter in the art rock trio Stick Men. He is also a member of the progressive/experimental bands TU (with fellow King Crimson alumnus Trey Gunn), KTU (with Gunn, Kimmo Pohjonen and Samuli Kosminen), and Tuner (a duo with Markus Reuter).

Mastelotto was one of the two drummers in the Crimson ProjeKct, a six-piece band which merged Stick Men with the Adrian Belew Power Trio in order to play King Crimson music from the 1980s to 2000s periods.  In conjunction with engineer/programmer Bill Munyon, Mastelotto formed the IDM project BPM&M (which to date has recorded one album, 2001's 'XtraKcts & ArtifaKcts', which featured or sampled many King Crimson members and associates). In early 2021 he released a new album, A Romantic's Guide to King Crimson, with his wife Deborah on lead vocals, credited to The Mastelottos. The album featured reworked versions of twelve King Crimson songs, deliberately re-arranged in a more popular style in order to accent the group's songwriting and its gentler side.

O.R.k.

In 2015, Mastelotto joined Carmelo Pipitone (guitarist of Italian band Marta sui Tubi), Lorenzo Esposito Fornasari (singer and keyboard player with Berserk! and Obake) and Colin Edwin (former bass player with Porcupine Tree) in a new heavy progressive rock band called O.R.k. Their first album, "Inflamed Rides", was released the same year and was followed in 2017 by Soul of an Octopus, in 2019 by Ramagehead (with artwork by Adam Jones of Tool) and in 2022 by Screamnasium.

Other projects

Mastelotto's other projects include Mastica (an Americana/art-rock trio with Mark "Gum B." Williams of Poi Dog Pondering/Alejandro Escovedo band and Monica 'MonKey' Champion from Baboon Orchestra), and M.P.TU (with Little Feat guitarist Phil Brown, singer Malford Milligan and Spirit/Firefall/Heart bassist Mark Andes). He has continued to guest with Jay Terrien, Cock Robin, drummer Terry Bozzio, Mecca, Herd of Instinct, Tony Levin and the California Guitar Trio, and has contributed to major network television themes.

Since moving to Austin, Texas, Mastelotto has worked with Austinites Storyville, Abra Moore, ...And You Will Know Us by the Trail of Dead and theremin player Pamelia Kurstin.  In 2007 Mastelotto went on tour with The Flower Kings in Europe supporting their album The Sum Of No Evil, followed by an appearance at the enormous Creation of Peace festival in Kazan, Russia, with Adrian Belew, Tony Levin and Eddie Jobson. This was followed by another new project, HoBoLeMa, with Levin, Bozzio and Allan Holdsworth.

In 2014, he released a collaborative album with Tobias Ralph called ToPaRaMa.

Discography

References

External links 
 Biography at mastica.net
 Pat Mastelotto homepage
 Tuner MySpace page

1955 births
Living people
American rock drummers
American session musicians
King Crimson members
People from Chico, California
Mr. Mister members
20th-century American drummers
American male drummers
Stick Men (prog band) members
HoBoLeMa members